Wichrów may refer to the following places in Poland:
Wichrów, Lower Silesian Voivodeship (south-west Poland)
Wichrów, Łódź Voivodeship (central Poland)
Wichrów, Opole Voivodeship (south-west Poland)